Hepton is a surname. Notable people with the surname include:

Bernard Hepton (1925–2018), English theatre director and actor
Stan Hepton (1932–2017), English footballer

See also
Henton (surname)
Hepton Rural District, former rural district in the West Riding of Yorkshire, England